Phillip B. Walker (born March 20, 1956) is an American former professional basketball player. He won a championship with the Washington Bullets in 1977–78, which was his only season in the league.

Walker attended Millersville University of Pennsylvania and was born in Philadelphia.

External links
Career NBA stats

1956 births
Living people
American men's basketball players
Basketball players from Philadelphia
Lancaster Red Roses (CBA) players
Lehigh Valley Jets players
Millersville Marauders men's basketball players
Philadelphia 76ers draft picks
Shooting guards
Washington Bullets draft picks
Washington Bullets players
Central High School (Philadelphia) alumni